Horace Chapman (1866–1937) was a British tennis player who was at his peak in the 1890s.  At Wimbledon 1890 Chapman lost in the first round to Ernest Lewis.  He lost in the quarterfinals in 1891 to Harold Mahony.  In 1892 he lost in the semifinal to Ernest Lewis. In 1893 he lost in round one to Manliffe Goodbody. In 1894 he lost in round one to Tom Chaytor. In 1895 he lost his first match to Herbert Baddeley. In 1896 he beat Charles P. Dixon before losing to Harold Nisbet.  Chapman won several tournaments: the Sussex Championships in 1889 (over Wilberforce Eaves), Dinard in 1890 (over Arthur Gore), Bournemouth in 1891 and 1892, the Kent Championships in 1894 (beating Sydney Smith,  Manliffe Goodbody and Harry Barlow) and Boulogne in 1899.

References

1866 births
1937 deaths
19th-century male tennis players
British male tennis players
Place of birth missing